William F. Creed (1845 - November 8, 1903) of Malone, New York, was appointed auditor at the Manhattan Custom House by Daniel Magone, the Collector of the Port of New York. Later he was the deputy New York State Superintendent of Banks taking over the duties of Rodney Rufus Crowley.

Biography
He was born in 1845. He was a cashier at the Farmers National Bank of Malone, New York, then worked for Roswell Pettibone Flower in Manhattan.

He was appointed auditor at the Manhattan Custom House by Daniel Magone, the Collector of the Port of New York.

He died on November 8, 1903 in Plattsburgh, New York.

References

1845 births
1903 deaths
People from Malone, New York